The 1997 Copa CONMEBOL Finals were the final two-legged tie that decided the 1997 Copa CONMEBOL, the sixth edition of Copa CONMEBOL. The finals were contested in two-legged home-and-away format between Argentina's Lanús and Atlético Mineiro from Brazil. The matches were held at the Estadio Ciudad de Lanús, in Lanús, and at the
Mineirão, in Belo Horizonte.

It was Lanús's second appearance in the finals of the Copa CONMEBOL, being the defending champions, while Atlético Mineiro reached the finals for the third time. Atlético Mineiro won the tie 5–2 claiming its second title in the competition.

Background
The 1997 final was the first meeting between Atlético Mineiro and Lanús. Both sides went into the final chasing their second Copa CONMEBOL title. Lanús were the defending champions, and Atlético Mineiro had won the competition in 1992 and finished as runner-up in 1995.

Route to the final

Note: In all results below, the score of the finalist is given first (H: home; A: away).

Matches

Summary
In the first match, held in Lanús's La Fortaleza on 6 November 1997, the home team opened the scoreline with Ariel Ibagaza, but Atlético Mineiro tied before the end of the second half with Bruno. An own goal by José Serrizuela in the second half gave the Brazilians the lead, followed by two more goals by the visitors, by Hernani and Valdir (who would finish as top goalscorer in the competition). After the end of the match, Lanús's defender Oscar Ruggeri assaulted Atlético Mineiro's Jorginho, and a brawl ensued. Atlético players and staff were trapped against the fence surrounding the pitch and attacked by Lanús players and supporters. Among other injured players and staff in the confrontation, Atlético's head coach Emerson Leão had to undergo surgery after being hit in the face.

The second match was played at the Mineirão, in Belo Horizonte, on 17 December 1997. Atlético Mineiro fielded four forwards in an attempt to rout Lanús again, but the lack of midfielders in the Brazilian team allowed the Argentine one to advance. Lanús had many youngsters in the squad, but had the match was even, with an Atlético Mineiro goal by Jorginho in the first half and the equaliser by Marcelo Trimarchi in the second. There were security concerns after the brawl in the first match, but no violent incidents occurred in Belo Horizonte.

Details

First leg

Second leg

See also
1997 Copa CONMEBOL

References 
General

 
 

Specific

m
m
Copa CONMEBOL Finals
c
c